Werner Franz Josef Wilhelm Detlev Bornheim gen. Schilling (6 February 1915 – 29 October 1992) was a German art historian and historic preservationist.

Life

Origin 
His grandfather Mathias (1852-1899), together with his four siblings, sold the inherited land in Langel in 1888 and finally settled in Nippes north of Cologne's old town. From Bornheim's marriage to Anna Maria Lob (1857-1931), the Duisburg-born daughter of Mathias Lob, director of the municipal gas and waterworks there, produced, among others, their son Richard (born in Cologne in 1885). After studying at the universities of Paris (Sorbonne), Zurich and Cologne, he graduated as a social civil servant in 1915. Richard's marriage to Victoria Speckhan (born 1889 in Cologne-Nippes), the daughter of Franz Josef Speckhan and Katharina von Bornheim gen. Schilling produced their son Werner.

Career 
In particular, he was scientifically influenced by Wilhelm Pinder, Gerhart Rodenwaldt and Nicolai Hartmann. 

On 17 September 1940, he was awarded a Dr. phil. in Berlin with the thesis Zur Entwicklung der Innenraumdarstellung in der Niederländischen Malerei bis Jan van Eyck. promoviert. Subsequently, during the Second World War, he found work as a volunteer at the Rheinisches Museum (Haus der Rheinischen Heimat) in Cologne-Deutz and the Wallraf-Richartz-Museum & Fondation Corboud (1942) in Cologne employment. While Cologne continued to suffer from the heavy air raids and increasingly fell into rubble and ashes, but also threatened to sink into chaos, Bornheim gen. Schilling was busy with protective measures. His prudence in connection with the preservation and protection of threatened cultural assets found its first opportunity for practical proof in the removal of Cologne's museum holdings to Langenau.

After the liberation of Cologne, he then briefly assisted the reappointed Lord Mayor Konrad Adenauer, with whom he had been in contact since 1944, as custodian and advisor for the preservation of monuments and museums, before he was able to use the experience he had gained in this way usefully in his upcoming places of service.  Afterwards, in 1945, he first changed to the position of government conservator of the Regierungsbezirk Koblenz and subsequently, in 1946, to that of provincial conservator for Rhineland and Hesse-Nassau. When the State Office for the Preservation of Monuments of the newly founded federal state of Rhineland-Palatinate was formed, he was then appointed the first State Conservator. He remained in this position until his retirement in 1980. During this period, the office had grown to about 100 employees.  

Schilling published extensively on the art history of the Rhineland, its artists but also cultural monuments in particular. His three-volume work Rheinische Höhenburgen, published in 1964, deserves special mention. According to Ronig, his very personal essay Rheinische Denkmalpflege - Rheinland-Pfalz 1945 bis 1980, published in 1981, represents "something like the intellectual testament" of him.

Honorary posts 
Outside of his work as a state conservator, Bornheim took on numerous other functions and tasks. Among them are: his involvement in the "Association of State Monument Conservators in the Federal Republic of Germany", to which he belonged since its foundation in 1948. In 1958, he became deputy chairman and from 1963 to 1975 he held this position himself. In 1975, he hosted the 4th General Assembly of International Council on Monuments and Sites in this capacity in Rothenburg. Schilling actively maintained memberships in numerous other domestic and foreign commissions. For example, in the  Head of the Expert Group on Monument Preservation and corresponding member of the Compagnie des Architects en Chef des Monuments Historique de la France. 

Various organisations awarded him honorary titles. Schilling was an honorary citizen of the city of New Orleans and an honorary member of the German Castles Association as well as the Grand Ducal Institute.

He also held an honorary professorship at the Johannes Gutenberg University Mainz in Mainz. Werner Bornheim gen. Schilling was awarded the Federal Cross of Merit on ribbon in 1980 and the Federal Cross of Merit 1st class in 1985.

Family 
Schilling, who spoke English, French and Italian in addition to his mother tongue, had been married to the doctor Godula Frosch since 1955. Their marriage produced a daughter and a son.<ref name="Weristwer">Bornheim gen. Schilling, Werner. In  Das deutsche Who's Who. XXVIIth edition 1988/1989, Schmidt-Römhild, Lübeck 1988, .</ref>

Bornheim died in Wiesbaden at the age of 77.

 Publications 
 Rheinische Höhenburgen. Publisher  (Jahrbuch 1961–1963), Gesellschaft für Buchdruckerei, Neuss 1964, 3 volumes.
 Rheinische Denkmalpflege – Rheinland-Pfalz 1945 bis 1980. In Erhalten und gestalten. 75 Jahre Rheinischer Verein für Denkmalpflege und Landschaftsschutz. Publisher Rheinischer Verein für Denkmalpflege und Landschaftsschutz (Jahrbuch 1981), Gesellschaft für Buchdruckerei, Neuss 1981, .

 References 

 Further reading 
 Bornheim gen. Schilling, Werner. In Werner Schuder (ed.): Kürschners deutscher Gelehrten-Kalender 1976. 12th edition, I vol., A–M und Register, de Gruyter, Berlin/ New York 1976, .
 Bornheim gen. Schilling, Werner. In Wer ist wer? Das deutsche Who's Who. XXVIIth edition 1988/1989, Schmidt-Römhild, Lübeck 1988, .
 Denkmalpflege in Rheinland-Pfalz. Festschrift für Werner Bornheim gen. Schilling. Edited by Landesamt für Denkmalpflege, Mainz 1980, incl. Kurzvita und Bibliographie bis einschl. 1979  
 Veit Geißler: Professor Dr.Werner Bornheim gen. Schilling 1915–1992. In Denkmalpflege in Rheinland-Pfalz. Jahresberichte 1989–1991. Jahrgang 44–46, Publisher Landesamt für Denkmalpflege Rheinland-Pfalz, Wernersche Verlagsanstalt, Worms 1994, . 
 : Werner Bornheim gen. Schilling zum Gedenken. In Rheinische Heimatpflege. 30th Jahrgang, Nr 1, 1993, .
 Franz Ronig: Begegnung mit Werner Bornheim gen. Schilling. In Rheinische Heimatpflege. 30th Jahrgang, Nr.1, 1993, .

 External links 
 Private Webseite with extensive reproduction of the works edited from 1931 onwards by Werner Bornheim and published by himself in 1940. Geschichte der Familie (v.) Bornheim 1107–1940.''
 Werner Bornheim gen. Schilling, in: Verzeichnis der Professorinnen und Professoren der Universität Mainz

German art historians
Historical preservationists
Officers Crosses of the Order of Merit of the Federal Republic of Germany
1915 births
1992 deaths
Architects from Cologne